Passenger compartment or passenger cabin may refer to any of these areas designated for passengers in vehicles:

 In automobile passenger cars, the area of the vehicle physically separated from the engine compartment, trunk or boot, etc., usually including the driver
 In limousines, the passenger compartment excluding the driver area
 In fixed-wing aircraft and other aircraft, a passenger area physically separated from the cockpit 
 In railway cars, the area designed for passengers
 In ships and boats, an area designed for passengers that is physically separated from the bridge and other areas 
 Compartment (ship), an area as above that is generally structurally separate and often watertight from non-passenger areas
 Passenger cabin (ship), a room or suite designed for one or a few passengers; a stateroom

See also
 Passenger car (disambiguation)